All for One or All 4 One may refer to:

 One for all, and all for one (Unus pro omnibus, omnes pro uno), the motto of Dumas' Three Musketeers, and the traditional motto of Switzerland

Film and television 
 All for One (film), a 2011 Danish film
 All for One (TV series), a Canadian reality series
 "All for One" (The Bionic Woman), a television episode

Music 
 All-4-One, an American R&B group
 All for One Records, African-American record label commonly known as AFO

Albums 
 All-4-One (All-4-One album), 1994 
 All 4 One (beFour album) or the title song (see below), 2007
 All for One (Raven album) or the title song, 1983
 All for One (The Screaming Jets album), 1991

Songs 
 "All 4 One" (song), a song by beFour
 "All 4 One", a song by Azad and Kool Savas
 "All for One" (The Stone Roses song), 2016
 "All for One", by Blackmore's Night from Ghost of a Rose, 2003
 "All for One", by Brand Nubian from One for All, 1990
 "All for One", by Diana Ross from The Boss, 1979
 "All for One", by James Brown from Reality, 1974
 "All for One", by Stryper from Against the Law, 1990
 "All for One", from the High School Musical 2 soundtrack, 2007

Other uses
 Ratchet & Clank: All 4 One, a video game in the Ratchet and Clank franchise
 All For One (My Hero Academia), a Quirk (and metonymously named character) in the manga and anime series My Hero Academia

See also
 One for all (disambiguation)